Arun is an Indian surname that may refer to the following notable people:
Asim Arun (born 1970), Indian politician
Avinash Arun, Indian cinematographer and film director
 Bharat Arun (born 1962), Indian Test cricketer
Chinmayi Arun, Indian lawyer
Gayatri Arun, Indian actress 
 Ila Arun, Indian actress
Masud Arun, Bangladesh Nationalist Party politician
Parvathy Arun, Indian actress
 Priya Arun (born 1970), Indian actress 
Rajendra Arun (1945–2021), Indian scholar of the Ramayana and of Indian philosophy
V. G. Arun, Indian judge 
Vinod Bala Arun, Indian philosophy scholar

Indian surnames